Macroschisma productum, common name the elongated keyhole limpet, is a species of sea snail, a marine gastropod mollusk in the family Fissurellidae, the keyhole limpets and slit limpets.

Description
The length of the shell varies between 22 mm and 40 mm.

Distribution
This marine species occurs in the following locations:
 Madagascar
 New South Wales, Victoria, South Australia, Western Australia and Tasmania.

References

External links
 To Biodiversity Heritage Library (6 publications)
 To World Register of Marine Species
 

productum
Gastropods described in 1850